The Sunbeam Arab was a British First World War era aero engine.

Design and development
By 1916 the demand for aero-engines was placing huge demands on manufacturing.

First bench-run in 1916, the Arab was obviously inspired by the Hispano-Suiza V-8 engines but with very little in common when examined in detail. After submission to the Internal Combustion Engine Committee of the National Advisory Committee Sunbeam received an order for 1,000 in March 1917, increased to 2,000 in June 1917 as well as another 2,160 to be built by Austin Motors (1,000), Lanchester Motor Company (300), Napier & Son (300), and Willys Overland (560) in the United States of America. Bench testing revealed defects which required rectification, delaying completion of production drawings. Despite the delays one of the first flight-ready Arabs flew in a Martinsyde F.2 two-seat fighter/reconnaissance aircraft in mid 1917.

Service use of the Arab was limited because of poor reliability and persistent vibration problems, causing some 2,350 orders to be cancelled and remaining orders 'settled', compensating manufacturers for costs incurred.

Developed from the Arab were the inverted V-8 Sunbeam Bedouin, straight six Sunbeam Dyak, W-12 Sunbeam Kaffir, and 20 cylinder radial Sunbeam Malay.

Variants
Arab
The production engine loosely based on the Hispano-Suiza 8 V-8 engines.
Bedouin
In common with many other contemporary engine manufacturers the Arab was re-designed to run inverted and given the name Sunbeam Bedouin. Intended to provide better forward visibility for single-engined aircraft there is no evidence that the Bedouoin was fitted to an aircraft or flew.
Kaffir
A W-12 broad arrow engine using blocks, heads and valve-gear from the Arab, giving .
Dyak
A straight six extrapolation of the Arab retaining the  stroke and  bore of the Arab, but with only two valves per cylinder as opposed to the three valves on the Arab.
Pathan
Coatalen expressed his interest in diesel engines by designing a diesel derivative of the Dyak with the same attributes, developing  at 1,500 rpm. Only prototypes of the Pathan were built.
Malay
The Sunbeam Malay was a 20-cylinder radial aircraft engine of  capacity manufactured by Sunbeam using five four-cylinder blocks from the Arab arranged around a central crankshaft. The Malay retained the  ×  bore and stroke of the Arab, as well as the three valves per cylinder and overhead cam shafts.

Applications
Data from Brew.

 Armstrong-Whitworth F.K.10
 Avro 530
 Bristol F.2b Fighter
 Bristol Scout F
 Fairey F.2a
 Fairey N.2a
 Grain Griffin
 Martinsyde F.2
 Norman Thompson N.2c
 Norman Thompson NT.2b
 Royal Aircraft Factory AE.3 Ram
 Royal Aircraft Factory SE.5a
 Sage 4B Seaplane Trainer
 Short Improved Navyplane
 Sopwith Cuckoo
 Sunbeam 1917 Bomber
 Supermarine Baby

Specifications (Arab I)

See also

References

Bibliography
 Lumsden, Alec. British Piston Engines and their Aircraft. Marlborough, Wiltshire: Airlife Publishing, 2003. .
 Brew,  Alec. Sunbeam Aero-Engines. Airlife Publishing. Shrewsbury.

External links

 
 

Arab
1910s aircraft piston engines